The Oregon Department of Human Services (ODHS) is the principal human services agency of the government of the U.S. state of Oregon. ODHS helps Oregonians achieve wellbeing and independence through opportunities that protect, empower, respect choice and preserve dignity, especially for those who are least able to help themselves.

DHS provides direct services to more than 1 million Oregonians each year. These services provide a key safety net for those who are most vulnerable or who are at a difficult place in their life.

History 

1971: The Oregon Legislature created the Oregon Department of Human Resources, an agency providing a spectrum of human services to individuals, families and communities. Over the years parts of the agency were spun off, becoming the Oregon Department of Corrections, the Oregon Employment Department, the Oregon Youth Authority, and the Oregon Housing and Community Services Department.

2001: The Oregon Legislature reorganized the department and changed its name from the Oregon Department of Human Resources to the Oregon Department of Human Services.

2009: The Oregon Legislature transferred many of the health related functions to the newly created Oregon Health Authority. Today, the Department of Human Services key functions serve children and families, seniors and people with disabilities.

See also 
Oregon Performance Reporting Information System
Oregon Health Authority

References

External links

Human Services, Oregon Department of
State departments of health of the United States
Medical and health organizations based in Oregon
1971 establishments in Oregon